Hvardiiske  (translated from Ukrainian and Russian - Guards)  is an urban-type settlement in Dnipropetrovsk Oblast, Ukraine. It is part of Novomoskovsk Raion. It belongs to Cherkaske settlement hromada, one of the hromadas of Ukraine. Population:  According to the 2001 census, population was 5,199.

Hvardiiske is better known for housing the 25th Airborne Brigade (Ukraine) (since summer of 2002) and originally was established in 1957 as a military base for the 42nd Guards Tank Division. The town was named for the Guards designation of the unit.

References

External links
 Hvardiiske at the Verkhovna Rada website

Urban-type settlements in Novomoskovsk Raion